This is a list of electoral results for the electoral district of Crows Nest in Queensland state elections.

Members for Crows Nest

Election results

Elections in the 1990s
Results for the 1998 election were:

References

Queensland state electoral results by district